Berrytown can refer to several places:

Berrytown, Delaware
Berrytown, Louisville, Kentucky
Berrytown, Pennsylvania
Berrytown, Virginia

See also
Berryton (disambiguation)